Destroyer leader (DL) was the United States Navy designation for large destroyers from 9 February 1951 through the early years of the Cold War. United States ships with hull classification symbol DL were officially frigates from 1 January 1955 until 1975. The smaller destroyer leaders were reclassified as destroyers and the larger as cruisers by the United States Navy 1975 ship reclassification so destroyer escorts could be reclassified as frigates (FF) in conformance with international usage of the term.

Background
By the end of World War I the destroyers intended to screen formations of battleships had evolved to a displacement of approximately 1,100 tons armed with four  guns and six or more torpedoes. Italy had built three  esploratori (scout cruisers) approximately 70% larger than contemporary destroyers. The Washington Naval Treaty encouraged the United Kingdom's satisfaction with its traditional fleet of s and the United States' contentment with the similar  and s, while the signatories with smaller fleets explored alternative warship configurations between the classical definitions of destroyer and cruiser. Italy launched three more  esploratori and France responded with six Chacal-class contre-torpilleur super destroyers. Japan launched the minimum light cruiser  followed by the Fubuki-class special type destroyers  with endurance to escort the Kido Butai mobile force of aircraft carriers over the wide reaches of the Pacific.

Germany built similarly enlarged Zerstörer when it commenced naval rearmament.

Description
As the United States Navy thinned its wartime fleet following World War II, the smaller destroyers were discarded until only those over 2,000 tons remained in active service. Naval architects had a few years to evaluate captured ships and combat experience before there was any need for more warships. With large inventories of destroyers and cruisers, new surface warship designs explored placing high-efficiency boilers in hulls of intermediate size. The first destroyer leader  was authorized in 1948 and laid down in 1949 as an anti-submarine hunter-killer cruiser based on the  anti-aircraft cruiser, themselves originally conceived as destroyer leaders. She was designated EDL-1 while engaged in experimental work with new sensors and weapons systems including SQS-23 sonar, Weapon Alpha, RUR-5 ASROC and automatic 3 inch/70 Mark 26 guns. She served entirely in the Atlantic except for a single deployment to the Indian Ocean and cruise around the world in 1968 shortly before she was retired from active service. A sister ship was authorized, but not completed after experience with the prototype did not justify repetition of the design.

The next design was for an unarmored cruiser of displacement similar to Italian s to carry the new 5 inch/54 caliber Mark 42 gun. Each of the four  ships received somewhat different experimental propulsion machinery powered by  (8.3 MPa) Combustion Engineering forced-circulation boilers in DL-2 and DL-3; and Foster Wheeler boilers in DL-4 and DL-5. DL-2 and DL-3 had General Electric turbines while DL-4 and DL-5 had Westinghouse turbines. All four ships began operations in the Atlantic. DL-3 and DL-5 were transferred to the Pacific in 1956. DL-3 made routine deployments to the western Pacific for as long as she remained in commission, but DL-5 was transferred back to the Atlantic in 1963 after making a few western Pacific deployments. DL-2 and DL-4 made routine deployments to the Mediterranean Sea. The ships were built with AN/SPS-6 air search radar, AN/SPS-8 height finding radar, AN/QHBa scanning sonar and AN/SQG-1 attack sonar. During their first refit in the mid-1950s the AN/SQG-1 and AN/QHBa were replaced by AN/SQS-4 sonar and the secondary open 3 inch/50 caliber guns were replaced by 3 inch/70 Mark 26 guns. Later refits removed the unsatisfactory 3 inch/70 guns and Weapon Alpha. 

After experimental flight operations with the Bell HUL-1 and Kaman HTK-1 aboard Mitscher in 1957, helicopter decks and hangars for the Gyrodyne QH-50 DASH were installed where the aft 3-inch guns had been. DL-2 and DL-3 underwent major overhaul at the Philadelphia Naval Shipyard beginning in 1966 including new Foster Wheeler boilers, AN/SQS-23 sonar, AN/SPS-37 air search radar, AN/SPS-48 height finding radar, and the Tartar Guided Missile Fire Control System for RIM-24 Tartar missiles. DL-4 and DL-5 had earlier received a new 70-foot bow section mounting the AN/SQS-26 sonar and spent the remainder of their service lives testing these prototypes until retirement, when their sisters emerged from overhaul at Philadelphia in 1968 for another decade of service as guided missile destroyers.

A third class of destroyer leaders was designed after observing the performance of propulsion and weapons systems tested aboard the Mitscher class. The first three ships were ordered with three 5 inch/54 caliber guns shortly after the name change to frigates. The next three were ordered with two 5 inch/54 guns forward, and a RIM-2 Terrier missile system aft, marking the transition to guided missile frigates (hull classification symbol DLG), intended to defend aircraft carriers against anti-ship cruise missiles. ASROC and sonar gave the guided missile frigates an anti-submarine capability that most of the World War II cruiser conversions lacked. All were reclassified as guided missile destroyers in 1975.

Similar ship classes

Evolution into guided missile cruisers
Two additional DLG classes and two similar nuclear-powered ships (DLGN) were completed by 1975 for a total of twenty additional guided missile frigates. These significantly larger ships were reclassified as guided missile cruisers (CG/CGN) in 1975. By 1995 the former guided missile frigates were replaced by the s and s.

See also
 Esploratori
 Flotilla leader
 Scout cruiser
 Guided missile frigate
 Guided missile destroyer
 Guided missile cruiser
 List of destroyers of the Second World War
 List of United States Navy destroyer leaders

Sources

Notes

Ship types